The Green Mill Ford Bridge was a historic structure located northeast of Janesville, Iowa, United States. This Bowstring through arch-truss bridge was originally erected in Waverly, Iowa after the Bremer County Board of Supervisors found the previous timber structure bridge was worn out. It was designed and erected by the King Iron Bridge and Manufacturing Co. of Cleveland. John R. Price and Brothers built the substructure. The total cost for constructing the bridge was $16,000. It remained in service at this location until 1898 when it was replaced by a girder bridge. The bow string trusses were dismantled three years later. One of the spans was erected over the Cedar River in Franklin Township, while the remaining two spans were erected here in Jefferson Township. The Green Mill Ford Bridge was closed to traffic in 1988. The bridge was listed on the National Register of Historic Places (NRHP) in 1998.

The bridge was carried downstream by the Cedar River on March 16, 2019, in a flood with heavy ice flow. It was removed from the NRHP in September of the same year.

References

Bridges completed in 1902
Buildings and structures in Bremer County, Iowa
National Register of Historic Places in Bremer County, Iowa
Road bridges on the National Register of Historic Places in Iowa
Bowstring truss bridges in the United States
1902 establishments in Iowa
Former National Register of Historic Places in Iowa